Muzon is the name of several barangays in Luzon, the Philippines.

Muzon, Malabon
Muzon, Naic, Cavite
Muzon, San Jose del Monte, Bulacan
Muzon, San Juan, Batangas
Muzon, San Luis, Batangas
Muzon, Taytay, Rizal
Muzon I, Rosario, Cavite
Muzon II, Rosario, Cavite
Muzon Primero, Alitagtag, Batangas
Muzon Segundo, Alitagtag, Batangas